Khuzestani Arabic is a dialect of Gelet (Southern) Mesopotamian Arabic spoken by the Iranian Arabs in Khuzestan Province of Iran. Whilst being a southern Mesopotamian Arabic dialect, it has many similarities with Gulf Arabic in neighbouring Kuwait. It has subsequently had a long history of contact with the Persian language, leading to several changes. The main changes are in word order, noun–noun and noun–adjective attribution constructions, definiteness marking, complement clauses, and discourse markers and connectors.

Khuzestani Arabic is only used in informal situations. It is not taught in school, not even as an optional course, although Modern Standard Arabic is taught at a basic level for religious purposes. Almost all Khuzestani Arabic speakers are bilingual in Arabic and Persian (the official language of Iran). Khuzestani Arabic speakers are shifting to Persian; if the existing shift continues into the next generations, according to Bahrani & Gavami in Journal of the International Phonetic Association, the dialect will be nearly extinct in the near future.

Distribution
Khuzestani Arabic is spoken in Ahvaz, Hoveyzeh, Bostan, Susangerd, Shush, Abadan, Khorramshahr, Shadegan, Hamidiyeh, Karun, and Bawi.

Contact and lexis
The Khuzestani Arabic dialect is in contact with Bakhtiari Lurish, Persian and Mesopotamian Arabic. Although the lexis of the dialect is primarily composed of Arabic words, it also has Persian, English, French and Turkish loanwords. In the northern and eastern cities of Khuzestan, Luri is spoken in addition to Persian, and the Arabic of the Kamari Arabs of this region is "remarkably influenced" by Luri. In cities in Khuzestan such as Abadan, some of the new generations, especially females, often mainly speak Persian. A number of Khuzestani Arabic speakers furthermore only converse in Persian at home with their children.

Phonology

Vowels

Consonants

Even in the most formal of conventions, pronunciation depends upon a speaker's background. Nevertheless, the number and phonetic character of most of the 28 consonants has a broad degree of regularity among Arabic-speaking regions. Note that Arabic is particularly rich in uvular, pharyngeal, and pharyngealized ("emphatic") sounds. The emphatic coronals (and ) cause assimilation of emphasis to adjacent non-emphatic coronal consonants. The phonemes  ⟨پ⟩ and  ⟨ڤ⟩ (not used by all speakers) are only occasionally considered to be part of the phonemic inventory, as they exist only in foreign words and they can be pronounced as  ⟨ب⟩ and  ⟨ف⟩ respectively depending on the speaker.

Phonetic notes:

 is pronunciation of // in Khuzestani Arabic and the rest of southern Mesopotamian dialects.
The gemination of the flap /ɾ/ results in a trill [r].

See also 

 Al-Ahvaz TV

References

Sources
 

Gilit Mesopotamian Arabic